Sweden held a general election throughout September 1914.

Results
The General Electoral League and Farmers' League had a tactical arrangement that saw all the votes for the latter land as Electoral League in the constituencies. Therefore, the Electoral League may correctly also be attributed 268,631 votes or 36.7%.

Regional results

Percentage share

By votes

County results
After the dissolution of first-past-the-post, most counties retained multiple constituencies. This county list separates Stockholm and the namesake county since those were different counting areas.

Percentage share

By votes

Results by city and district

Blekinge

Gothenburg and Bohus

Gotland

Gävleborg

Halland

Jämtland

Jönköping

Kalmar

Kopparberg

Kristianstad

Kronoberg

Malmöhus

Norrbotten

Skaraborg

Stockholm

Stockholm (city)

Stockholm County

Södermanland

Uppsala

Värmland

Västerbotten

Västernorrland

Västmanland

Älvsborg

Örebro

Östergötland

References

Results of the 1914 September